The Vasus are a group of Hindu deities.

Vasu may also refer to:

Surname 
Ayinoor Vasu (born 1930), Indian writer, activist and trade unionist
E. Vasu (born 1935), Indian writer
Mona Vasu (born 1982), Indian actress
P. Vasu (born 1954), Indian film director
Vinita Vasu, Indian painter

Given name 
Vasu Chanchlani (1952–2014), Canadian businessman
Vasu Pisharody (born 1943), Indian artist
Vasu Trivedi, Indian politician

Others 
 Vasupujya, 12th Jain Tirthankara
Vasu (film), 2002 Indian film